Chah Haftad Tumani-ye Do (also Romanized as Chāh Haftād Tūmānī-ye Do; also known as Ḩājj ʿAbbās Shohāb Dāyīn (Persian: حاج عباس شهابداين); also known as Chāh Haftād Tūmānī) is a village in Golestan Rural District, in the Central District of Sirjan County, Kerman Province, Iran. At the 2006 census, its population was 42, in 10 families.

References 

Populated places in Sirjan County